Wild Over You is a 1953 Warner Bros. Looney Tunes short animated film directed by Chuck Jones. The short was released on July 11, 1953, and stars Pepé Le Pew.

The short uses the standard formula outlined in For Scent-imental Reasons (1949), where a female black cat named Penelope Pussycat accidentally acquires a white stripe down her back, which attracts an amorous and hopelessly romantic skunk, Pepé Le Pew, whom mistakes her for another skunk. It is the first Pepé Le Pew cartoon to have Maurice Noble credited for layouts, and the first credited animation by Abe Levitow. The human characters and signage in the animation uses Franglais to signal to an American audience that the cartoon takes place in France, with the heavily accented Pepé Le Pew resembling actor Charles Boyer.

Plot
In the Paris Exposition of 1900, a colorful arrangement of tourists are guided around a zoo (a rather cruel zoo by today's standards), but are panic-stricken to find a wildcat has escaped. Elsewhere, the escaped wildcat stalks around the park. Seeing an animal controller from the zoo pursuing her, she spots some black and white paint nearby and paints herself to look like a skunk, scaring the animal controller off. Her black and white appearance however attracts the attention of Pepé Le Pew, who, after some flirting, receives a mauling for his effrontery. He shrugs it off, saying, "I like it" (this has caused the cartoon much controversy for implying sadomasochism). The wildcat hides inside a fortune teller's hut and Pepé, disguised as a swami, predicts to her that she will meet a fine gentleman. When she runs outside, Pepé is there already, disguised as said gentleman. He again receives a mauling from the wildcat, and incorrectly assumes, "Flirt".

Later on, Pepé wanders into a wax museum finding the wildcat posing as a boa around the neck of a wax sculpture of Marie Antoinette and he himself poses as a coonskin cap on a sculpture of Daniel Boone. The wildcat flees and hides inside a suit of armor with Pepé in there. A third mauling from the wildcat causes the parts of the suit to rearrange themselves. The wildcat then hides inside a replica of Madame Pompadour's carriage and Pepé is in there again. After a fourth mauling, he asks himself in a daze if all this abuse is worth love and answers the question himself by saying it was worth it.

The wildcat carries the chase outside, becoming more tired as Pepé pursues her. She comes by a hot air balloon, climbs inside and cuts the support ropes, launching the balloon into the air. Pepé appears beside her again and he receives one final mauling as the balloon floats upwards into the sky ("If you have not tried it, do not knock it...").

References

External links

1953 films
1953 animated films
1953 short films
1950s Warner Bros. animated short films
Short films directed by Chuck Jones
Films set in 1900
Films set in Paris
Looney Tunes shorts
Animated films about cats
1953 romantic comedy films
American romantic comedy films
Films scored by Carl Stalling
Pepé Le Pew films
Films with screenplays by Michael Maltese
Exposition Universelle (1900)
1950s English-language films